Solomon Joseph Hottenstein (May 5, 1844May 24, 1896) was an American soldier and member of the 107th Pennsylvania Infantry who fought in the American Civil War and was awarded the Medal of Honor for seizing the flag that belonged to a group of Confederate Army soldiers. Confederate soldiers subsequently pursued Hottenstein and were captured by Union Army soldiers.

Hottenstein was born in Lehigh County, Pennsylvania and died in Manassas, Virginia, where he was interred in Manassas Cemetery. He had seven children.

References

1844 births
1896 deaths
American Civil War recipients of the Medal of Honor
Military personnel from Pennsylvania
People from Lehigh County, Pennsylvania
Union Army soldiers
United States Army Medal of Honor recipients